Nancy Palm is a longtime Republican Party activist, primarily known as the chairwoman of the Harris County, Texas Republican Party during the 1970s, and who also received one vote favoring her as a candidate for Vice President of the United States.

In 1972 she was a delegate to the Republican National Convention; at the following 1976 Republican National Convention Palm became one of just three women to have received an unsuccessful nomination for Vice President within the Republican Party. She was credited with helping to create the Republican Party of Texas. Palm was one of the electors from Texas for the 2000 presidential election. In 2002 she was an honoree of the League of Women Voters of Houston, Texas and the county government designated a day in her favor, along with her counterpart Billie Carr.

References

Further reading
 Oral History Interview with Nancy Palm at Oral Histories of the American South

Activists from Texas
Female candidates for Vice President of the United States
Texas Republicans
Living people
Year of birth missing (living people)
21st-century American women